Fudêncio e Seus Amigos (lit. Fudêncio and his friends) is a Brazilian adult animated sitcom created by Thiago Martins, Marco Pavão and Flávia Boggio for MTV Brasil.

The plot consists of adult-themed, intentionally shocking but funny stories involving a group of five 9-year-old school friends including a punk boy who wears no clothes, a politically correct but extremely unlucky fruit-boy, a drug-addicted depressed girl and a jovial trans girl. Fudêncio e Seus Amigos became popular among Brazilian youngsters for a short period for its gallows humour style and cameos from various personalities.

A total of six seasons featuring 179 episodes were produced and aired in Brazil from August 23, 2005 to August 25, 2011.

Characters 

 Fudêncio - Sarcastic, macabre, cynical, shameless. Fudêncio is far from being an exemplary hero. In any normal school, this little boy with spikes on his head would be in the boardroom. Fudêncio loves rock. Fudêncio is acclaimed as a hero, even with his vocabulary limited to "mimimi mimi" (which everyone understands perfectly, since each beat is a word). Always doing better at everything than Conrad, Fudêncio has already been a pilot, army general, MTV VJ, political revolutionary, etc. (voiced by Thiago Martins)
 Conrad Khaki - One of the main characters of Fudêncio and his Friends, his head is a persimmon that people often mistakenly believe to be a tomato. He can be considered a complete magnet of all misfortunes in existence. Conrad is 9 years old, and is the son of a tomato with an orange, and most of the time is confused with a tomato. To make his public school student worse, Fudêncio constantly fills the bag of poor Conrad, who most often tries to get his rights or ends up doing something politically correct, which is mistakenly interpreted by various characters, like Lieutenant Kevin Costa, who always calls him "Damn Reggae Youth!". Conrad is hopelessly in love with Zezé Maria, who is either a cross-dresser or a transgender girl. Conrad knows about this, but that does not stop him from loving him/her, regardless of whether Zezé Maria is a boy or girl. Compared to the other characters, Conrad is the only character who knows how to differentiate good from evil. (voiced by Fernando Peque from 2005-2007, Felipe Solari from 2008-2009 and Cauê Zunchini from 2010-2011)
 Funérea - This little girl hates everything and everyone. She presented a talk show on MTV, Misfortune with Funérea, and interviewed people like Di Ferrero, Ratinho, Marcelo Taz, Tatá Werneck, MariMoon, Dani Calabresa, Fofão, Christian Pior, André Vasco and Mallu Magalhães. She was interviewed by Ronnie Von on All Her Own. (voiced by Flávia Boggio)
 Zezé Maria - Although regarded as a young transgender girl with a strongly masculine voice, it has never been clear whether Zezé Maria is a boy or a girl, although in several episodes he/she is only a cross-dresser with long blond hair. But all this has little importance in the universe of Fudêncio, especially for Conrad, who ignores this small detail and has a great passion for her. (Voiced by Cacá Marcondes from 2005-2009 and Ieié Marcondes from 2010-2011)
 Popoto Conceição Massa Gordinho - No one knows Popoto's true age. The fact that he's doing 4th grade for the eighth time suggests that he is a little older than his friends. But if passing depends on his "quickness" of reasoning, he will do 4th grade a few more times, maybe forever. It is also debatable how he came in 4th grade. In one episode, it is revealed that he is 34 years old, in another that Popoto has been alive since prehistory and - along with Fudêncio - is immortal. Popoto always wears a Che Guevara shirt and is a character who loves to laugh, always after that something speaks, it lives blending the pants besides the same in some episodes to be fond of faeces and still has a tycoon uncle. (voiced by Thiago Martins)
 Safeno - The name gives you a clue. Safeno does not have very good health. Instead of a lunchbox, he always walks around with his serum. But the precarious state of his heart, liver, gut (and all his other organs) do not stop this nice little boy from being part of Fudêncio's adventures. (Voiced by Geninho Simonetti)
 Yoshiro Shishiro "Neguinho" da Silva - A black boy who is known for almost always being the target of some racial prejudice. Despite his youth, he has the voice of a classically trained baritone. All his relatives are Japanese but he claims not to be adopted and his parents say the same. In an episode in which the students' families were introduced, his family appears next to the taxi driver who serves them, who is also black, which leads everyone to believe that he is the true father of Neguinho. Neguinho is the least profane student in his class. He has a brother named Sensaku (a phonetic pun with "no bag") who does not speak Portuguese. (Voiced by Thiago Martins from 2005, Fernando Peque from 2006-2007 and André Aguiar from 2008-2011)
 Professor Maria Cudi Ampola - Better known as Professor Cudi, she is the primary teacher of the majority of the children, students of José Mojica Marins. Her main passion is to distribute negative points during class. But Fudêncio knows how to deceive this teacher so well that he became her favorite pupil. Bordão: "Conrad, negative point for you!". (voiced by Marta Ferreira)
Officers - Two incompetent policemen working in a police station near the primary school, who frequently arrest Conrad for unfair reasons.
 Peruíbe de Mongaguá - This is a young version of Gérson, the Brazilian who wants to take advantage of everyone. He loves planning methods to take advantage of his schoolmates' problems by promising help - luckily it is not recognized as interference in drawing. He is in love with Malu Mongolians, but she always rejects him. Bordão: "So, if you're going to die, can you get some new toys for me?!" (voiced by Marco Pavão)
 Baltazar Barata - Although he is the tutor of the devilish Fudêncio, Baltazar Barata is a fellow beyond understanding and educated. He also has irresistible charm and chivalry, and is perhaps the only cockroach worshiped by women. So much so that parent-school meetings are the most popular among girls. (Voiced by Thiago Martins)

Series overview

Episodes

Season 1 (2005)
The series premiered on August 23, 2005. There were three episodes of 10 minutes per broadcast.

Season 2 (2006)
The 2nd season started on May 27 and ran through September 23. During this season two episodes of 11 minutes a day were shown.

Season 3 (2007)
The 3rd season was shown between May 15 and December 27. At the end of this season, Funérea debuted his talk show Infortúnio.

Season 4 (2008)
In the 4th season, Caqui Conrado began to be voiced by MTV Brasil's Felipe Solari. Of the 24 episodes, 16 were shown from May 5 to 16. From August 4 to 14, the rest of the episodes were shown. From August 15 to November 8, MTV aired reruns of this season's episodes. The season had ended and new episodes would only be shown in 2009. Reruns of the week's episodes continued until November 29, and from December 8, reruns of the previous episodes of the season also began to air.

Season 5 (2009)
Season 5 started on March 2, 2009. The first ten episodes, shown in the first two weeks of March, were editions of "Misfortune". The second wave of episodes premiered on May 11 and also lasted two weeks.

Season 6 (2011)
Season 6 debuted with news: the episodes are weekly again, the design of some characters has changed (for example, Joey Ramone has a more "Ramonian" style), new characters have entered and characters that were once extras, such as Chopped Clown, they took on a bigger role. No episodes of the series have been produced since the end of this season.

References

2000s adult animated television series
2010s adult animated television series
2010s Brazilian adult animated television series
2010s Brazilian animated television series
Brazilian adult animated comedy television series
Brazilian flash animated television series
2005 Brazilian television series debuts
2011 Brazilian television series endings
2000s Brazilian television series
2010s Brazilian television series
LGBT-related animated series
2000s black comedy television series
Surreal comedy television series
Portuguese-language television shows
Animated television series about children